Kerem Ben Zimra is a moshav in northern Israel. Near Safed in the Upper Galilee, it falls under the jurisdiction of Merom HaGalil Regional Council.

History
The moshav was founded in 1949 by immigrants to Israel from Turkey on the site of the depopulated Palestinian village of al-Ras al-Ahmar. Rabbi Meir Yehuda Getz (1924–1995), a kabbalist and the first rabbi of the Western Wall in Jerusalem, was among the founders of the moshav, which was named after Rabbi David Ben Zimra, who was buried with his father Yosef nearby.

New immigrants from Romania and Morocco later joined the moshav.

The moshav is the home of the Rimon Winery.

Kerem Ben Zimra nature reserve
In 1968 a 68-dunam nature reserve was declared on the land south of the moshav. Flora includes Mt. Atlas mastic trees (terebinth), Valonia oaks, Palestine Oaks, Buckthorns, and Styrax officinalis.

References

Moshavim
Nature reserves in Israel
Populated places in Northern District (Israel)
Populated places established in 1949
1949 establishments in Israel
Moroccan-Jewish culture in Israel
Romanian-Jewish culture in Israel
Turkish-Jewish culture in Israel